Shane Christopher Mangroo (born 12 March 1993) is a Seychellois swimmer. At the 2012 Summer Olympics, he competed in the Men's 100 metre freestyle, finishing in 50th place overall in the heats, failing to qualify for the semifinals.

References

1993 births
Living people
Seychellois male freestyle swimmers
Olympic swimmers of Seychelles
Commonwealth Games competitors for Seychelles
Swimmers at the 2012 Summer Olympics
Swimmers at the 2010 Commonwealth Games